, also known as , ,  , and  Kamowakeikazuchi-no-kami is a god of lightning, thunder and storms in Japanese mythology and the Shinto religion. He is typically depicted with fierce and aggressive facial expressions, standing atop a cloud, beating on den-den daiko drums with tomoe symbols drawn on them. Iconography of Raijin are often found in Japanese temples and shrines. He is usually depicted alongside Fūjin, the god of wind.

Etymology 

Description 

Raijin is often depicted with a fierce, frightening face and a muscular figure with gravity-defying hair. He is surrounded by Taiko drums that he plays to create the sound of thunder. Raijin holds large hammers in his hands that he uses to play the drums. In some cases, Raijin is portrayed with three fingers which are said to represent the past, present and future. Two of the most notable sculptures of Raijin are located in the Sanjusangendo temple and the Taiyuin Rinnoji temple.  

Raijin and Fujin reside side by side in the Kaminarimon gate that guards the entrance to the Sanjusangendo temple. These sculptures are made of wood with lacquer, gold leaf and paint along with crystal, inlaid eyes. The Raijin and Fujin sculptures in Sanjusangendo are considered national treasures.    

In the Taiyuin Rinnoji temple, Raijin and Fujin are located in the Niten-mon gate. They are made of wood with paint and are seen with their token talismans, Raijin's drums and Fujin's wind bag.   

Raijin is also often seen in the company of his brother, Fujin, and his son, Raitaro. He is often seen fighting with Fujin, mending his drums, or causing mischief. He is also shown in the company of Raiju, a thunder-beast or thunder demon which also acts as his totem animal and usually a dog or wolf.

Mythology

Birth 
In the myths recorded in the Kojiki, after Izanami died from the wounds inflicted on her by the birthing of Hinokagutsutchi, her husband Izanagi followed her down into Yomi no Kuni, the land of darkness. When he asked her to come with him, Izanami responded that she cannot leave, because she had already eaten from the food there. As Izanagi followed her all the way to Yomi, to try to fulfill his wish that she go with him, Izanami returned to her palace to negotiate with the residing kami. Izanami was gone for several hours, which made Izanagi worried for her. Thus, after making fire on the tip of his comb, he entered the palace.  

There, Izanagi found Izanami's corpse. On her body maggots gathered, and on her head arose , on her chest , in her stomach , on her vagina , in her left hand , in her right hand , on her left leg  and on her right leg ; collectively called .

Upon seeing Izanami's twisted body, Izanagi fled from Yomi, shaken and in terror. In shame of allowing him to see her unsightly form, Izanami sent Raijin and several female demons to chase after Izanagi, after he fled the image of her rotting form, to bring him back to Yomi.

Capture of Raijin 
Another story describes Raijin as a mischief-maker, causing the destruction leading the Emperor to order Sugaru (the God Catcher) to imprison Raijin and deliver him to the in order to stop a storm. Sugaru first petitioned Raijin in the name of the emperor to give himself over willingly and cease the storm, to which Raijin laughs at Sugaru. Sugaru then prays to Kannon, Kannon ordered Raijin to let Sugaru, then she later delivered Raijin to him. Sugaru then tied him up in a sack and took him to the Emperor. Under the control of Sugaru and the emperor, Raijin was forced to stop his destruction and bring only rain and bounty to Japan.

Defending Japan 
In one legend, Raijin is shown to defend Japan against the invading Mongols. In this legend, the Mongols are driven off by a vicious storm in which Raijin is in the clouds throwing lightning and arrows at the invaders.

Genealogy 

Raijin has many siblings, most notably, Fujin (the god of wind), Kagutsuchi (the god of fire), Susanoo (the god of the sea and storms), Tsukuyomi (god of the moon), and Amaterasu (the goddess of the sun). Raijin also has a son named Raitaro.

Modern role 
Some Japanese parents tell their children to hide their belly buttons during thunderstorms so that Raijin does not take them away and eat them.  

Raijin also appears in the kabuki play Narukami, in which he is imprisoned under a pool of water, thus causing a drought.

Gallery

See also 

 Fūjin (Japanese), god of wind
 Izanagi (Japanese), one of the divine pair of creation deities
 Izanami (Japanese), one of the divine pair of creation deities
 Lei Gong (Chinese), god of thunder
 Dian Mu (Chinese), goddess of lightning
 Parjanya (Hindu), god of rain, thunder and lightning
 Sanjūsangen-dō (Japanese temple)

References

External links

 Netsuke: masterpieces from the Metropolitan Museum of Art, an exhibition catalog from The Metropolitan Museum of Art (fully available online as PDF), which contains many representations of Raijin

Japanese gods
Shinto kami
Thunder gods